Newspapers in Kuwait are published in English, French and Urdu, in addition to Arabic. the publishing reach the peak at 2009 there were 14 Arabic dailies, three English dailies and a dozens weekly newspapers in Kuwait. but the numbers decreased since then either by 2008 financial crisis and the increase of digital news sources or by government censorship. 

This is an incomplete list of newspapers in Kuwait.

Arabic language daily newspapers
 Al-Seyassah —  daily since 1965 
 Al-Qabas —  since 1972
 Al-Anbaa —  since 1976
 Al Rai —  Alrai-Alaam from 1995 until 2006
 Al-Wasat —  since 2007
 Annahar —  since 2007
 Al-Shahed —  since 2007
 Al-Jarida —  since 2007
 Al-Sabah —  since 2007
 Al Kuwaiteya —  since 2011

English language daily and weekly newspapers
 Kuwait Times —  since 1961
 Arab Times —  since 1977

Non-daily newspapers 
 Al Kuwait Magazine —  since 1928
 Kuwait Alyawm —  since 1954
 Al Bayan —  since 1966
 Afaaq —  since 1978
 Al-Arabi —  since 1958 
 Al Dustor —  semi-daily since 1997 from Kuwait National Assembly
 Sout Al Khaleej —  since 1962
 Al Mouasher Economic Weekly —  since 1994
 The Times Kuwait —  English weekly since 1996
 Dark Politics — since 2018

Defunct newspapers
 Al Khaleej —ٍ2009-2020
 Al Shahed weekly —  2004-2019
 Al Taleea — 1962-2016 
 Al-Watan —1974-2015 
 ِAlRay AlAam -1962–1995  
 Alam Al Yawm — 2007-2014
 Al Balad 2008
 Al-Watan Daily - 2008-2013
 Al Mustagbal - 2010-2012  
 Arrouiah - 2007–2010
 Awan - 2007–2010
 Assawt - 2008–2009
 Sawt alKuwait - 1990–1993 during the Invasion of Kuwait by State of Kuwait government
 Alfajer Aljadeed - 1991–1993 was published by Mr. Yousif Olyan and Dr.Yasin Taha Al-Yasin
 26 Febrayer - 1991
 Al-Nida' - 1990–1991 during the Invasion of Kuwait by Republic of Kuwait government
 Al jamaheer - 1983-1990
 Daily News - 1963-

References

 
Kuwait
Newspapers